The City Hall station was a station on the IRT Second Avenue Line in Manhattan, New York City, which also served trains of the IRT Third Avenue Line. It lay along Park Row, south of the Manhattan Municipal Building, across the street from the BRT’s Park Row Terminal. It had 2 levels. The lower level served Third Avenue trains and had two tracks with two side platforms for exiting passengers, and a center island platform for entering passengers. The upper level served Second Avenue trains and had two tracks and two side platforms for exiting passengers, and one island platform for entering passengers. Second Avenue trains served the station until June 13, 1942, and Third Avenue trains served the station until December 31, 1953. The next stop to the north was Chatham Square for all trains.

References

City Hall Elevated Station (NYCSubway.org)
Third Avenue El Remnants (Forgotten NY.com)

IRT Third Avenue Line stations
IRT Second Avenue Line stations
Railway stations in the United States opened in 1879
Railway stations closed in 1953
1879 establishments in New York (state)
1953 disestablishments in New York (state)
Former elevated and subway stations in Manhattan